News Vanguard is a Bengali language television news channel based in the India's North-eastern state of Tripura.

Reference

External links

 

Bengali-language television channels in India
Mass media in Tripura
Year of establishment missing